Pelfrey is a surname. Notable people with the surname include:

Doug Pelfrey (born 1970), American football player
Mike Pelfrey (born 1984), American baseball player and coach
Ray Pelfrey (1928–2017), American football player

See also
Palfrey (surname)